Alive Again is the second studio album by contemporary Christian musician Matt Maher, released on September 22, 2009. It is his second album with Essential Records. It reached #6 on the Billboard Christian albums chart, and reached #128 on the Billboard 200. The single "Alive Again" became the top selling Christian and Gospel single on iTunes Rewind.  The song "Hold Us Together" was the No. 1 K-LOVE song of 2010.

Critical Reception 

Allmusic's Jared Johnson said this album "Matt takes a big leap forward on this record and offers some of the better-written praise & worship tracks to come along in some time."

Christian Music Review's Laura Chambers alluded to the album as having "no actual weeds; it is the senses and condition of the listener that alone determine the resonance each song will have."

''Christianity Todays Andrea Bailey Willits noted that "discriminating ears long for intelligent worship songs cut from slightly darker cloth, and Matt Maher heeds that cry with an unselfconscious sophomore effort."Cross Rhythms's Carl Grimsditch told of this album that "overall this is well crafted worshipful music."Jesus Freak Hideout's Roger Gelwicks said he "can't honestly say that Alive Again is that unique of a worship experience." However, he said "anyone looking for solid, unique worship would be wise to look there, but if you were a fan of Matt Maher's first outing, his follow-up will suit you just fine."Jesus Freak Hideout's Sara Kelm called this "a decent offering from this worship leader."  But she was highly critical, when she said "it could easily be transitioned from the album to a church worship setting, even stereotypically bringing down the volume for a chorus before ramping it up again. That's the major problem with this album, if one could call it that. This collection of songs is nothing special. Most of the songs, while having nice melodies, do not strike me as particularly different or challenging. The album has a common worship sound, with no real risks taken. Plus, the last half of the album seems weighed down with mellow songs, slowing the pace considerably."  Furthermore, she noted "if you want a worship album that is something different and new in terms of style and sound, look around at some of the other worship albums released this year. But if you liked Maher's first album and just really like the basic 'worship album' feel, this would be a good album for you."Louder Than the Music's''' Jono Davies said this album "is a very clean and powerful worship album and over time has grown on me as one of my favorite albums of the year."  In addition, Davies noted that "overall a wonderful album, not scared to sing out the name of Jesus in the lyrics."

Accolades

In 2010, the album was nominated for a Dove Award for Praise & Worship Album of the Year at the 41st GMA Dove Awards. The title song was also nominated for Worship Song of the Year.

Track Listing

Personnel 
 Matt Maher – vocals, acoustic piano, Fender Rhodes, acoustic guitar, glockenspiel, vibraphone
 Audrey Assad – acoustic piano, backing vocals 
 Cason Cooley – acoustic piano, electric piano, Omnichord
 Christopher Stevens – programming, backing vocals 
 Tyler Burkum – guitars, electric guitar, backing vocals 
 Paul Moak – electric guitar, acoustic guitar, baritone guitar, pedal steel guitar, bass, backing vocals
 Tony Lucido – bass, Moog bass
 Jeremy Lutito – drums, percussion, programming 
 Will Sayles – percussion 
 Claire Indie – cello 
 Chris Carmichael – strings, string arrangements 
 Blaine Barcus – backing vocals 
 Addie Davis – backing vocals 
 Nina Williams – backing vocals 
 Jamie Lee Wilson – backing vocals

Production 
 Paul Moak – producer, engineer, recording 
 Christopher Stevens – producer, mixing 
 Jake Hartsfield – assistant engineer 
 Scott Hundley – assistant engineer 
 Justin March – assistant engineer 
 Richard Dodd – mastering at RichardDodd.com
 Blaine Barcus – A&R 
 Heather Hetzler – A&R coordinator 
 Tim Parker – art direction, design 
 Tec Petaja – photography 
 Heather Cummings – hair stylist, make-up 
 The Brown Book Agency – management

Charts

Album

Singles

References

2009 albums
Matt Maher albums
Essential Records (Christian) albums